This is an incomplete list of Statutory Rules of Northern Ireland in 1995.

1-100

 Students Awards Regulations (Northern Ireland) 1995 (S.R. 1995 No. 1)
 Urban Waste Water Treatment Regulations (Northern Ireland) 1995 (S.R. 1995 No. 12)
 Social Security (Incapacity Benefit) (Transitional) Regulations (Northern Ireland) 1995 (S.R. 1995 No. 35)
 Social Security (Incapacity for Work) (General) Regulations (Northern Ireland) 1995 (S.R. 1995 No. 41)
 Disability Working Allowance and Income Support (General) (Amendment) Regulations (Northern Ireland) 1995 (S.R. 1995 No. 67)
 Statutory Sick Pay Percentage Threshold Order (Northern Ireland) 1995 (S.R. 1995 No. 69)
 Social Security Benefits Up-rating Order (Northern Ireland) 1995 (S.R. 1995 No. 71)
 Social Security Benefits Up-rating Regulations (Northern Ireland) 1995 (S.R. 1995 No. 72)
 Social Security (Industrial Injuries) (Dependency) (Permitted Earnings Limits) Order (Northern Ireland) 1995 (S.R. 1995 No. 73)
 Social Security (Contributions) (Re-rating and Northern Ireland National Insurance Fund Payments) Order (Northern Ireland) 1995 (S.R. 1995 No. 79)
 Explosives in Harbour Areas Regulations (Northern Ireland) 1995 (S.R. 1995 No. 87)

101-200

 Spirit Drinks (Amendment) Regulations (Northern Ireland) 1995 (S.R. 1995 No. 105)
 Social Security (Reciprocal Agreements) Order (Northern Ireland) 1995 (S.R. 1995 No. 110)
 Companies (1986 Order) (Audit Exemption) Regulations (Northern Ireland) 1995 (S.R. 1995 No. 128)
 Social Security (Incapacity Benefit) (Consequential and Transitional Amendments and Savings) Regulations (Northern Ireland) 1995 (S.R. 1995 No. 150)
 Welfare of Animals (Scheduled Operations) (Amendment) Order (Northern Ireland) 1995 (S.R. 1995 No. 173)

201-300

 Units of Measurement Regulations (Northern Ireland) 1995 (S.R. 1995 No. 226)
 Fair Employment Tribunal (Remedies) Order (Northern Ireland) 1995 (S.R. 1995 No. 240)
 Children (1995 Order) (Commencement No. 1) Order (Northern Ireland) 1995 (S.R. 1995 No. 248)
 Social Security (Adjudication) Regulations (Northern Ireland) 1995 (S.R. 1995 No. 293)
 Airports (1994 Order) (Commencement) Order (Northern Ireland) 1995 (S.R. 1995 No. 294)

301-400

 Arts Council (1995 Order) (Commencement) Order (Northern Ireland) 1995 (S.R. 1995 No. 304)
 Companies (Fees) Regulations (Northern Ireland) 1995 (S.R. 1995 No. 312)
 Companies (Inspectors' Reports and Records Inspection) (Fees) Regulations (Northern Ireland) 1995 (S.R. 1995 No. 313)
 Offshore Installations and Pipeline Works (Management and Administration) Regulations (Northern Ireland) 1995 (S.R. 1995 No. 340)
 Trade Union and Labour Relations (1995 Order) (Commencement and Transitional Provisions) Order (Northern Ireland) 1995 (S.R. 1995 No. 354)
 Conservation (Natural Habitats, etc.) Regulations (Northern Ireland) 1995 (S.R. 1995 No. 380)
 Eggs (Marketing Standards) Regulations (Northern Ireland) 1995 (S.R. 1995 No. 382)
 Companies (Forms) Regulations (Northern Ireland) 1995 (S.R. 1995 No. 383)
 Judicial Pensions (Preservation of Benefits) Order (Northern Ireland) 1995 (S.R. 1995 No. 388)
 Judicial Pensions (Guaranteed Minimum Pension) Order (Northern Ireland) 1995 (S.R. 1995 No. 389

401-500
)
 Social Security (Canada) Order (Northern Ireland) 1995 (S.R. 1995 No. 405)
 Child Support (1995 Order) (Commencement No. 1) Order (Northern Ireland) 1995 (S.R. 1995 No. 428)
 Social Security (Income Support and Adjudication) (Amendment) Regulations (Northern Ireland) 1995 (S.R. 1995 No. 434)
 Occupational Pensions (Revaluation) Order (Northern Ireland) 1995 (S.R. 1995 No. 435)
 Feeding Stuffs Regulations (Northern Ireland) 1995 (S.R. 1995 No. 451)
 Home Energy Conservation Act 1995 (Commencement) Order (Northern Ireland) 1995 (S.R. 1995 No. 455)
 Pensions (1995 Order) (Commencement No. 1) Order (Northern Ireland) 1995 (S.R. 1995 No. 477)
 Social Security (Graduated Retirement Benefit) (Amendment) Regulations (Northern Ireland) 1995 (S.R. 1995 No. 483)

External links
  Statutory Rules (NI) List
 Draft Statutory Rules (NI) List

1995
Statutory rules
Northern Ireland Statutory Rules